The 1970 FIBA Africa Championship for Women was the 3rd FIBA Africa Championship for Women, played under the rules of FIBA, the world governing body for basketball, and the FIBA Africa thereof. The tournament was hosted by Togo from March 28 to April 4, 1970.

Madagascar defeated the United Arab Republic 44–36 in the final to win their first title  and qualify for the 1971 FIBA Women's World Championship.

Draw

Preliminary round

Group A

Group B

Knockout stage

Semifinals

5th place match

Bronze medal match

Final

Final standings

Awards

External links
Official Website

References

1970 FIBA Africa Championship for Women
1970 FIBA Africa Championship for Women
AfroBasket Women
Basketball in Togo
International sports competitions hosted by Togo